The Trnava is a river in northern Croatia, a right tributary of the Mura River and the last significant one to flow into Mura before its confluence with Drava. It flows through Međimurje County.

Geography and hydrography

The river is 46,9 km (29,14 mi) long and its watershed drains an area of about 250 km2 (96,5 sq.mi). It has its source at an elevation of 300 meters near the village of Vukanovec in the Gornji Mihaljevec municipality, which is situated in the hilly, northwestern part of the County. The upper course of the river flows southwards, then turns by the village of Macinec to the east. It flows further as a slow-moving plain stream, mouthing into the Mura. The river mouth is located near the village of Goričan at an elevation of 140 meters.

Trnava is incorporated into the water retention ponds' and irrigation canal network of Međimurje County. Water level of the river can fluctuate throughout the year, being occasionally very low during periods of drought and sometimes extremely high after heavier rains.

Throughout its course, Trnava  receives the waters of many tributaries (most of them coming from the left side, like Dragoslavec, Goričica, Pleškovec, Knezovec, Hrebec, Brezje, Boščak, Murščak, Korenatica, and a few of them from the right side, like Kopenec and Sratka), becomes wider, deeper and slower, and finally empties into the Mura.

Along its banks is a chain of villages (Gornji Mihaljevec, Macinec, Nedelišće, Pribislavec, Štefanec, Mala Subotica, Palovec, Strelec, Držimurec, Turčišće) as well as the town of Čakovec, the County seat.

History

In the past, Trnava was a left tributary of the Drava River, but following the occasional changes of watercourses of the Drava and Mura in many centuries ago (due to flooding) it was cut through by Mura, becoming the latter's right tributary. The lower course of the river still exists today and is called Stara Trnava (=Old Trnava), being incorporated into the Bistrec-Rakovnica water canal network, which empties into the Drava east of Donja Dubrava.

During past centuries Trnava was important for filling up the moats around the Zrinski Castle in Čakovec. In the first half of the 20th century the river was not yet properly regulated and this often led to flooding. The last serious flood in Čakovec occurred on 12 March 1963. Since then the river banks have been reconstructed and raised, so that flooding stopped.

Gallery

External links 
 Map of the Gornji Mihaljevec municipality with the upper course of Trnava
 Trnava empties into the Mura River at Goričan 
 Earlier Trnava was full of fish  
 Drainage and irrigation works in the Trnava River basin

Rivers of Croatia
Landforms of Međimurje County